Ekaterina Makarova was the defending champion, but lost in the first round to Ana Bogdan.

Svetlana Kuznetsova won the title, beating Donna Vekić in the final, 4–6, 7–6(9–7), 6–2, despite being four match points down in the second set.

Seeds

Draw

Finals

Top half

Bottom half

Qualifying

Seeds

Qualifiers

Lucky losers

Draw

First qualifier

Second qualifier

Third qualifier

Fourth qualifier

References
Main Draw
Qualifying Draw

Citi Open - Women's Singles